Clare  is a parliamentary constituency represented in Dáil Éireann, the lower house of the Irish parliament or Oireachtas. The constituency elects 4 deputies (Teachtaí Dála, commonly known as TDs) on the system of proportional representation by means of the single transferable vote (PR-STV).

History
Clare is historically a Fianna Fáil stronghold. The party founder Éamon de Valera served the constituency for 38 years, from 1921 to 1959, for many years of that time as Taoiseach and then, on his resignation as a TD, as president of Ireland. From 1917 to 1922 he had been Sinn Féin Westminster MP for the preceding constituency of East Clare. His granddaughter, Síle de Valera, represented the constituency from 1987 to 2007. Other notable former deputies include Patrick Hillery (later president 1976–1990), the long-serving Ceann Comhairle (chairman of the Dáil) Patrick Hogan and Moosajee Bhamjee, the first Muslim TD.

Boundaries
The constituency was created by the Government of Ireland Act 1920 and has been in use for Dáil elections since the 1921 election. From the 2020 general election, the constituency spans the entire area of County Clare. The Electoral (Amendment) (Dáil Constituencies) Act 2017 defines the constituency as:

The constituency's boundaries have varied since its formation in 1921.

TDs

Elections

2020 general election

2016 general election

2011 general election

2007 general election

2002 general election

1997 general election

1992 general election

1989 general election

1987 general election

November 1982 general election

February 1982 general election

1981 general election

1977 general election

1973 general election

1969 general election

1968 by-election
Following the death of Fine Gael TD William Murphy, a by-election was held on 14 March 1968. The seat was won by the Fianna Fáil candidate Sylvester Barrett.

The surplus votes of the elected candidate were distributed after being declared elected because there was a possibility another candidate could have reached the threshold of a third of a quota which would have meant their election deposit was returned to them.

1965 general election
The reason for the third count was a possibility of a candidate reaching a third of the quota in order to save their deposit.

1961 general election

1959 by-election
Following the election of Éamon de Valera as President of Ireland, a by-election was held on 22 July 1959. The seat was won by the Fianna Fáil candidate Seán Ó Ceallaigh.

1957 general election
The third count occurred because there was the possibility that surplus votes of elected candidates could have resulted in another candidate reaching the threshold of a third of a quota which would have meant their election deposit was returned to them.

1954 general election

1951 general election

1948 general election

1945 by-election
Following the death of Fine Gael TD Patrick Burke, a by-election was held on 4 December 1945. The seat was won by the Fianna Fáil candidate Patrick Shanahan.

1944 general election

1943 general election
Hughes, Seán Hogan and Halpin were eliminated on successive counts, but separate figures for the 3rd and 4th Counts are not available.

1938 general election

1937 general election
There is no record of any further counts, even though the difference between the votes of Hogan, the last elected candidate, and Shalloo, the runner up, after the seventh count was less than the sum of the undistributed surpluses.

1933 general election

1932 general election

September 1927 general election

June 1927 general election

1923 general election

1922 general election

1921 general election

|}

See also
Elections in the Republic of Ireland
Politics of the Republic of Ireland
List of Dáil by-elections
List of political parties in the Republic of Ireland

References

External links
Oireachtas Constituency Dashboards
Oireachtas Members Database

Dáil constituencies
Politics of County Clare
1921 establishments in Ireland
Constituencies established in 1921